Hamilton is a city in and the county seat of Marion County, Alabama, United States. It incorporated in 1896 and since 1980 has been the county's largest city, surpassing Winfield. It was previously the largest town in 1910. At the 2020 census, the population was 7,042.

History 
Hamilton was founded in the early 19th century by settlers who moved to the Alabama Territory from Tennessee, Kentucky, Virginia, Georgia and the Carolinas. It is built upon lands that once served as "hunting grounds" for the Chickasaw people. The city was first called "Toll Gate", but its name later changed in honor of one of its distinguished citizens, Captain Albert James Hamilton (known as A.J. Hamilton), who had represented Marion County in the state legislature in the sessions of 1869, 1874 and 1875. Captain Hamilton donated forty acres of his land to the town. The same forty acres were then divided into lots and sold to help defray the cost of building the courthouse. The Toll Gate community was elected in 1881 to be the next county seat, and by 1883 the Marion County courthouse in Pikeville had ceased to be functional. When the courthouse was moved from Pikeville to Toll Gate, the town's name was then changed from Toll Gate to Hamilton. On March 30, 1887, the newly built county courthouse was destroyed by fire. It was again rebuilt with wood, but replaced in 1901 with native sandstone.

During the Civil War, Union forces passed through the town in search of goods and horses. A detachment of Wilson's Cavalry destroyed by fire the plantation belonging to the Helvingstons on the Military Ford, south of Toll Gate (Hamilton).

Geography
Hamilton is located west of the center of Marion County, in the valley of the Buttahatchee River. Interstate 22 passes around the southern and western sides of the city, with access from Exits 7, 11, 14, and 16. I-22 leads west  to Tupelo, Mississippi, and southeast  to Birmingham. U.S. Routes 43 and 278 pass through Hamilton. US 43 leads north  to Florence, while US 278 leads east  to Cullman. The two highways join at the center of Hamilton and lead south together  to Guin.

The Buttahatchee River, a tributary of the Tombigbee River, flows northeast to southwest through the city, east of downtown.

Climate

According to the Köppen Climate Classification system, Hamilton has a humid subtropical climate, abbreviated "Cfa" on climate maps.

Demographics

2000 census
At the 2000 census there were 6,786 people, 2,695 households, and 1,800 families living in the city. The racial makeup of the city was 90.41% White, 7.59% Black or African American, 0.32% Native American, 0.49% Asian, 0.03% Pacific Islander, 0.49% from other races, and 0.68% from two or more races.  1.71% of the population were Hispanic or Latino of any race.
Of the 2,695 households 28.3% had children under the age of 18 living with them, 52.6% were married couples living together, 11.3% had a female householder with no husband present, and 33.2% were non-families. 30.6% of households were one person and 14.4% were one person aged 65 or older.  The average household size was 2.26 and the average family size was 2.81.

The age distribution was 19.8% under the age of 18, 8.9% from 18 to 24, 29.0% from 25 to 44, 25.9% from 45 to 64, and 16.5% 65 or older.  The median age was 40 years. For every 100 females, there were 106.9 males.  For every 100 females age 18 and over, there were 106.6 males.

The median household income was $27,489 and the median family income  was $34,485. Males had a median income of $26,362 versus $18,681 for females. The per capita income for the city was $17,505.  About 12.0% of families and 17.8% of the population were below the poverty line, including 23.7% of those under age 18 and 19.6% of those age 65 or over.

2010 census
At the 2010 census there were 6,885 people, 2,717 households, and 1,793 families living in the city. The racial makeup of the city was 89.3% White, 7.7% Black or African American, 0.4% Native American, 0.2% Asian, 0.0% Pacific Islander, 1.2% from other races, and 1.1% from two or more races. 3.1% of the population were Hispanic or Latino of any race.
Of the 2,717 households 25.2% had children under the age of 18 living with them, 48.1% were married couples living together, 13.7% had a female householder with no husband present, and 34.0% were non-families. 30.9% of households were one person and 13.7% were one person aged 65 or older.  The average household size was 2.30 and the average family size was 2.83.

The age distribution was 19.9% under the age of 18, 7.5% from 18 to 24, 25.1% from 25 to 44, 28.4% from 45 to 64, and 19.0% 65 or older.  The median age was 43.2 years. For every 100 females, there were 106.8 males. For every 100 females age 18 and over, there were 111.2 males.

The median household income was $31,297 and the median family income  was $42,361. Males had a median income of $31,112 versus $30,542 for females. The per capita income for the city was $17,442. About 12.1% of families and 19.2% of the population were below the poverty line, including 30.1% of those under age 18 and 15.5% of those age 65 or over.

2020 census

As of the 2020 United States census, there were 7,042 people, 2,684 households, and 1,695 families residing in the city.

Arts and culture
Several cemeteries in Hamilton still celebrate annual Decoration Days in the spring and summer.

Artifacts 
Indian Mounds site

Festivals 
Jerry Brown Arts Festival (held annually the first weekend in March)
Buttahatchee River Fall Fest (held annually in October)
Hamilton's Hometown Christmas (held annually in December)

Parades 
Homecoming parade (sponsored by Hamilton High School each fall)
Hamilton Christmas parade (held annually in December)

Parks and recreation
E.T. Sims Jr. Recreation Center, park, and playground
Key Branch Nature Trail and Aggieland Disc Golf course
Splash Pad playground

Education
Hamilton is a part of the Marion County School District. Hamilton Elementary School, Hamilton Middle School, and Hamilton High School serve the Hamilton area.

Hamilton has a branch campus of Bevill State Community College.

Media
Hamilton's local newspaper, The Journal Record, has a second office in Winfield, Alabama.

Hamilton is home to two local television stations: WMTY TV 46 (cable channel 5 ), and TV8-WATVC.

Infrastructure
Marion County – Rankin Fite Airport is located in Hamilton.

Notable people
Bookie Bolin, former NFL player
Jerry Brown, folk artist and traditional potter
Roger Brown, artist
Clay Dyer, professional bass fisherman
Rankin Fite, Alabama State Legislature (Senate & House of Representatives)
Rex Frederick, first head coach of the University of South Alabama men's basketball team
John Dabney Terrell Sr., planter and legislator
Karen Wheaton, Christian music artist, minister, founder of The Ramp

References

External links

Hamilton Area Chamber of Commerce

Cities in Alabama
Cities in Marion County, Alabama
County seats in Alabama